Lake Pewe is a small lake at  elevation on the uppermost Koettlitz bench,  east of Blackwelder Glacier in Victoria Land. Named in recognition of the glacial geomorphological work done in the Koettlitz Glacier area by Troy L. Péwé of the University of Alaska. It was near this lake that members of the Victoria University of Wellington Antarctic Expedition (VUWAE), 1960–61, found a note left by Péwé, reporting observations on glacial erratics. Named by the VUWAE party.

References

Lakes of Victoria Land
Scott Coast